Glade Creek Township is one of seven townships in Alleghany County, North Carolina, United States. The township had a population of 1,991 according to the 2010 census.

Glade Creek Township occupies  in northeastern Alleghany County. The township's eastern border is with Surry County, and the northern border is with the state of Virginia.

References

Townships in Alleghany County, North Carolina
Townships in North Carolina